An opinion piece is an article, usually published in a newspaper or magazine, that mainly reflects the author's opinion about a subject. Opinion pieces are featured in many periodicals.

Editorials

Opinion pieces may take the form of an editorial, usually written by the senior editorial staff or publisher of the publication, in which case the opinion piece is usually unsigned and may be supposed to reflect the opinion of the periodical. In major newspapers, such as the New York Times and the Boston Globe, editorials are classified under the heading "opinion."

Columns

Other opinion pieces may be written by a (regular or guest) columnist. Such pieces, referred to as "columns", may be strongly opinionated, and the opinion expressed is that of the writer (and not the periodical). However, not all columns are opinion pieces; for example, columnists may write columns that are nonsensical and solely intended for their humouristic effect.

Op-eds

An op-ed (abbreviated from "opposite the editorial page") is an opinion piece that appears on a page in the newspaper dedicated solely to them, often written by a subject-matter expert, a person with a unique perspective on an issue, or a regular columnist employed by the paper. Op-eds may be solicited by the editorial staff, but may also be submitted by the author for publication. Although the decision to publish such a piece rests with the editorial board, any opinions expressed are those of the author. A letter to the editor is a common example of this.

See also

Notes

Further reading

External links
Example of editorial policy 
How to Write an Op-ed or Column
Classic Op-Ed Structure
The Op-Ed Project
How to Write an Op-Ed video

Newspaper content
Opinion journalism